Lake Whitewood is a natural lake in Kingsbury County, South Dakota, in the United States.

Lake Whitewood received its name from the white timber near the lake.

See also
List of lakes in South Dakota

References

Lakes of South Dakota
Lakes of Kingsbury County, South Dakota